Vengeance is the first studio album by German Power metal group Mystic Prophecy. It was originally released on August 24, 2001 by B-Mind Records and reissued in 2003 by Nuclear Blast.

Track listing
 "1545 - The Beginning" - 1:02
 "Sky's Burning" - 6:45
 "Damnation And Darkness" - 4:30
 "Welcome (In The Damned Circle)" - 5:29
 "Dark Side Of The Moon" - 5:13
 "River Of Hate" - 4:45 
 "In The Mirror" - 5:09
 "In The Distance" - 5:02
 "When Shadows Fall" - 4:49
 "Fallen Angel" - 8:34

Credits
 Roberto Dimitri Liapakis-Vocals
 Gus G.-Guitars
 Martin Albrecht-Bass
 Dennis Ekdahl-Drums

2001 albums
Mystic Prophecy albums
Nuclear Blast albums